The Brookmans Park transmitting station is a facility for medium wave (MW) broadcasting at Brookmans Park, Hertfordshire, north of London. The station was built in the 1920s by the BBC as the first of a network of regional dual ("twin wave" was the term then used) transmitter stations, replacing the city-based ones used previously, and this was to cover the Home Counties, London and South East. The station is now owned by Arqiva and transmits BBC Radio 5 Live, talkSPORT, Absolute Radio and Lyca Radio.

History
The first station, on 842 kHz, (356m) 50 kW, went into service in on 21 October 1929, the second on 1148 kHz, (261m) initially 30 kW, followed on 9 March 1930.

The original antenna configuration for the station was two T-antennas hung from four  towers, one T-antenna to the north of the station and the other to the south of the station.

Shortly after the commencement of transmissions, the channels were identified by a name denoting its function. The National channel was carried on 842 kHz, and a "Regional" service on 1148 kHz.

The transmitting station itself featured the latest transmitters from the Marconi Company. No public electricity supply was available so large generators were installed and an extensive support staff was recruited and trained by the BBC.

In 1939, a  mast was built on the south side of the station, which along with the existing south T-antenna made a directional array pointing towards central London. This antenna configuration would be used after the war for the BBC Light Programme.

During the Second World War an extension was added to the northern side of the transmitter building and a 140 kW STC transmitter was installed.

The station was re-engineered in the late 1970s and an extra T-antenna (mini T) was hung between two  poles constructed a few hundred feet north from the original north T-antenna, and new transmission equipment was installed replacing the original Marconi transmitters, the 140 kW STC transmitter, and other BBC-designed transmission equipment which was installed in the 1960s.

After the re-engineering the south T-antenna and the  mast transmitted BBC Radio London and Radio 3; the north T-antenna along with the newly installed mini T-antenna was used for Radio 1, and the  mast was used for Radio 2.

In the years since the re-engineering little has changed to the antenna and structure layout of the station, but the services have changed and the station now transmits Absolute Radio instead of Radio 3, Sunrise Radio instead of BBC Radio London, Talksport instead of Radio 1, and BBC Radio 5 Live instead of Radio 2.

Much development has taken place and the station is now the home to many communications companies that operate various satellite and communication services.

Channels listed by frequency

Analogue radio (AM Medium Wave)

 As of 16:00 on 4 February 2014. Sunrise Radio stopped transmitting. 
Lyca Media then started transmitting at 23:00 on 1458 kHz. The station will be named at a later date.

On 20th January 2023, Absolute Radio was stopped broadcasting at 1215kHz, along with all its other AM frequencies across the UK.

Digital radio (DAB)

See also
List of masts
List of towers
List of radio stations in the United Kingdom

External links
 The Transmission Gallery: photographs and information
 A History of Brookmans Park Transmitting Station
 The London Twin-Wave Broadcasting Station Brookmans Park
 
 
 http://www.skyscraperpage.com/diagrams/?b20122

References

Transmitter sites in England
Infrastructure in London
Mass media in Hertfordshire